Mary Winifred Sylvia Donington (1909–1987) was a British musician and sculptor.

Biography
Donington was born in London, was educated at the Mary Datchelor School in Camberwell and had a classical music education at the Royal Academy of Music.
Although she spent a year, from 1945 to 1946, as a pupil of the sculptor Frank Dobson she was largely a self-taught artist. 

During her career as a sculptor Donington created portrait figures in bronze, terracotta and plaster and exhibited at the Royal Academy, with the Women's International Art Club, the Society of Women Artists and the National Society of Painters, Sculptors and Gravers / Printmakers. In 1948 she exhibited a bust of Rosemary Cowper at the Royal Glasgow Institute of the Fine Arts.

Donington lived for many years at Headley Down in Hampshire and is thought to have died there in February 1987.

References

Further reading
 British Sculptors of the Twentieth Century by Alan Windsor, 2003, published by Ashgate, 
 Dictionary of British Artists Working 1900–1950 by Grant M. Waters, 1975, published by Eastbourne Fine Art

1909 births
1987 deaths
20th-century British sculptors
20th-century English women artists
Alumni of the Royal College of Music
English women sculptors
People educated at Mary Datchelor School
Sculptors from London